Kaynarca is a village in Bor district of Niğde Province, Turkey. The population of Kaynarca was 717 in 2011. The village is famous for white cabbage production.

References 

Villages in Bor District, Niğde